Norderteich is a lake in North Rhine-Westphalia, Germany. At an elevation of 153 m, its surface area is 12.5 ha.

Lakes of North Rhine-Westphalia
LNorderteich
Ponds of Germany